Nguyễn Phúc Dương (died 18 September 1777) was one of the Nguyễn lords who ruled over the southern portion of Vietnam from the 16th-18th centuries. Duong was the first son  Nguyễn Phúc Hiệu, who is the son of lord Nguyễn Phúc Khoát. From 1774 to 1776, Duong was captured and used by the Tay Son rebels to gain popularity among the Southern Vietnamese. In 1776, he escaped and fled to Gia Dinh. Thereafter, Lý Tài, a Chinese mercenary general of the Nguyen army, granted him the title of Tân Chính Vương, a co-lord position with Nguyễn Phúc Thuần. In 1777, Dương was captured and executed by Tay Son rebels.

References
Tran Trong Kim (2005) (in Vietnamese). Việt Nam sử lược. Ho Chi Minh City: Ho Chi Minh city General Publishing House

Duong
1777 deaths
Year of birth unknown